Cartagogena februa is a species of moth of the family Tortricidae. It is found in Costa Rica.

The wingspan is about 24 mm. The ground colour of the forewings is yellowish cream, slightly sprinkled and strigulate (finely streaked) with brown. The hindwings are dirty cream, indistinctly reticulate (a net-like pattern) with brownish at apex and whitish in the basal and anal areas.

References

Moths described in 1992
Cochylini